National Highway 347A, commonly referred to as NH 347A is a national highway in  India. It is a spur road of National Highway 47. NH-347A traverses the states of Maharashtra and Madhya Pradesh in India.

Route 
Multai, Warud, Ashti, Arvi, Pulgaon, Wardha, Sevagram, Sonegaon, Hinganghat, Jamb, Warora.

Junctions  
 
  Terminal near Multai.
  Terminal near Warora.

See also 

 List of National Highways in India
 List of National Highways in India by state

References

External links 

 NH 347A on OpenStreetMap

National highways in India
National Highways in Maharashtra
National Highways in Madhya Pradesh